Lenora is an unincorporated community in Fillmore County, in the U.S. state of Minnesota.

History
Lenora was laid out in 1855. A post office was established at Lenora in 1856, and remained in operation until it was discontinued in 1905.

References

Unincorporated communities in Fillmore County, Minnesota
Unincorporated communities in Minnesota